Noel-Baker Academy (formerly Noel-Baker Community School) is a co-educational secondary school located in Alvaston, Derby, England.

The school takes students from the Alvaston, Boulton and Crewton areas of Derby. In September 2004, the school was awarded specialist school status as a Language College by the Department for Education and Skills (DfES).

Previously a foundation school administered by Derby City Council, in February 2017, Noel-Baker Community School converted to academy status and was renamed Noel-Baker Academy. The school is now sponsored by the LEAD Multi-Academy Trust.

The school was named after Olympic silver medallist, Derby South MP and Nobel Peace prize winner, Philip Noel-Baker.

Student Leadship Team 
Noel-Baker Academy has started there new house systems and new student leader we have six House Captains, five House Vice Captains and twenty House Prefects each house or year .

House Captains

Lead –Erin Lee

Empower –Kaleb Daborn

Achieve –Lakeisa Moyo

Drive –Muhammad Muntasir

Excel –Janai Carr-Fearn

House Vice Captains

Lead –DiDi Njoke

Empower –Rubie Watson

Achieve –Harry Day

Drive –Kirills Bulazs

House Prefects

Lead:

Year 7 Esther Toindepi

Year 8-Macey Rae Enright

Year 9-Teegan Goodwin

Year 10-Lillimae Wakefield

Empower:

Year 7- Cai Russell

Year 8-Isabelle Meakin

Year 9- Angelika Aleksandrowicz

Year 10- Maddison McFarlane

Year 11-Saskia Vernon

Achieve:

Year 7-Eric Mahaka

Year 8-Bailey Bradshaw

Year 9-Evelyn Hardy

Year 10- Cody Marshall

Drive:

Year 7- Igor Skorupa

Year 10- Learni Asri

Year 11- Jacob Driscoll

Year 8- Ashley Chinemo

Year 9- Rhianna Hogan

New building
The old building, over 50 years old and now demolished, has been replaced with a new building constructed on the old playing fields. The new building was ready for the beginning of the school year in September 2012 at a cost of £34 million. The 1,150 pupils have combined with 90 pupils from St.Martin's Special School which educates special needs students.

Notable former pupils
 Dame Glenda Bailey - editor of US fashion magazine Harper's Bazaar
 Keith Dowding - Professor of Political Science, Australian National University
 Christopher Jackson geologist
 Jordon Mutch - Birmingham City football club midfielder
 Ivan Gaskell - BBC sports presenter
 Janek Sirrs - award winning cinema special effects artist
 Tony Franklin - "The Fretless Monster" Bass Guitarist

References

External links
Noel-Baker Community School website
Ofsted Reports

Secondary schools in Derby
Academies in Derby